Dušan Spasojević (10 July 1968 – 27 March 2003), known by the nicknames Duća and Šiptar (meaning “Albanian”) was the head of one of the largest Serbian criminal groups on record, the Zemun clan.

The peak of this cartel's influence occurred from 2000 until 2003 when Spasojević was killed by Serbian police during a country-wide manhunt initiated after the assassination of Serbian Prime Minister Zoran Đinđić.

References

1968 births
2003 deaths
People from Medveđa
Serbian gangsters
Zemun Clan